George Thompson Ritchie (16 January 1904 – 10 September 1978) was a Scottish footballer who played in the Football League as a wing half.

Career
Born in Glasgow, Scotland, Ritchie played as a wing half for English clubs Blackburn Rovers, Leicester City and Colchester United and in Scotland for Fakirk.

He was part of the Leicester City side which finished in the club's highest ever league finish (until 2016) of runners-up in 1928-29. He returned to Leicester's coaching staff under the management of former teammate Johnny Duncan between 1946–1949.

Honours

Club
Leicester City
 Football League First Division Runner-up (1): 1928–29
 Football League Second Division Winner (1): 1936–37

Colchester United
 Southern Football League Cup Winner (1): 1937–38

References

External links
 
 George Ritchie at Colchester United Archive Database

Scottish footballers
English Football League players
Blackburn Rovers F.C. players
Falkirk F.C. players
Leicester City F.C. players
Colchester United F.C. players
1904 births
1978 deaths
Association football midfielders